De Nieuwe Wildernis is a 2013 Dutch natural history documentary film about the nature reserve Oostvaardersplassen in the Netherlands. The film shows animal life during four seasons, based on two years of filming in the reserve.

Animals 
43 different animal species are being shown and also mentioned in the film, per class these are the following.

Mammals 
Konik horse
red fox
Eurasian beaver
brown rat
red deer

Birds 
great cormorant
great crested grebe
greylag goose
mute swan
common kingfisher
common nightingale
common reed bunting
bluethroat
sedge warbler
Savi's warbler
western yellow wagtail
Eurasian bittern
water rail
Eurasian spoonbill
European goldfinch
common starling
common raven
great egret
barnacle goose
common buzzard
bearded reedling
European robin
little grebe
white-tailed eagle

Amphibians 
natterjack toad
common frog

Fish
common carp

Insects 
Colletes cunicularius
large earth bumblebee
yellow dung fly
Ranatra linearis
blowfly
aphid
ant
ladybird beetle
green-veined white
small cabbage white

Branchiopods
water flea.

Awards
 Film Poster Award (2013) at the Netherlands Film Festival
 Golden Film (2013) for 100,000 visitors
 Platinum Film (2013) for 400,000 visitors
 Rembrandt Award for Best Dutch Film (2014)
 Golden Calf for Best Popular Film (2014) at the Netherlands Film Festival

References

External links
 

2013 documentary films
2013 films
Documentary films about nature
Dutch documentary films
Nature conservation in the Netherlands